Rhimphalea is a genus of small moths, which is part of the family Crambidae.

Species
Rhimphalea anoxantha Hampson, 1912
Rhimphalea astrigalis Hampson, 1899 (Borneo, Thailand)
Rhimphalea circotoma Meyrick, 1889
Rhimphalea heranialis (Walker, 1859)
Rhimphalea lindusalis (Walker, 1859) (Australia)
Rhimphalea linealis Kenrick, 1907 (New Guinea)
Rhimphalea ochalis (Walker, 1859)
Rhimphalea perlescens Whalley, 1962
Rhimphalea sceletalis Lederer, 1863 (Australia, New Guinea)
Rhimphalea trogusalis (Walker, 1859)

Former species
Rhimphalea ocularis (C. Felder, R. Felder & Rogenhofer, 1875)
Rhimphalea papualis C. Felder, R. Felder & Rogenhofer, 1875

References

Spilomelinae
Crambidae genera
Taxa named by Julius Lederer